The 2019 British Champions Series, sponsored by QIPCO, was the ninth edition of the horse racing series comprising 35 of the UK's top flat races. The series began with the 2,000 Guineas at Newmarket on 4 May, and concluded with British Champions Day at Ascot on 19 October.

Results

The series was split into five categories: Sprint, Mile, Middle Distance, Long Distance and Fillies & Mares. Each category included seven races.

Sprint

Mile

Middle Distance

Long Distance

Fillies & Mares

See also

 2019 Epsom Derby
 2019 King George VI and Queen Elizabeth Stakes
 2019 Breeders' Cup Challenge series

References

External links

Official website

British Champions Series
British Champions Series
British Champions Series
British Champions Series
British Champions Series
British Champions Series
British Champions Series
British Champions Series
British Champions Series